Hulon Brocke Whittington (July 9, 1921 – January 17, 1969) was a United States Army officer and a recipient of the United States military's highest decoration—the Medal of Honor—for his actions in World War II.

Biography
Whittington joined the Army from Bastrop, Louisiana in August 1940, and by July 29, 1944 was serving as a Sergeant in the 41st Armored Infantry Regiment, 2nd Armored Division. On that day, near Grimesnil, France, he assumed command of his platoon and led it in a successful defense against a German armored attack. For his actions during the battle, he was awarded the Medal of Honor nine months later, on April 23, 1945.

Whittington became a commissioned officer in 1949 and reached the rank of major in 1960. While serving in Vietnam as an ARVN ordnance advisor, he suffered a heart attack, forcing him to retire. He died at age 47 and was buried in Arlington National Cemetery, Arlington County, Virginia.

Medal of Honor citation
Whittington's official Medal of Honor citation reads:
For conspicuous gallantry and intrepidity at the risk of life above and beyond the call of duty. On the night of 29 July 1944, near Grimesnil, France, during an enemy armored attack, Sgt. Whittington, a squad leader, assumed command of his platoon when the platoon leader and platoon sergeant became missing in action. He reorganized the defense and, under fire, courageously crawled between gun positions to check the actions of his men. When the advancing enemy attempted to penetrate a roadblock, Sgt. Whittington, completely disregarding intense enemy action, mounted a tank and by shouting through the turret, directed it into position to fire pointblank at the leading Mark V German tank. The destruction of this vehicle blocked all movement of the remaining enemy column consisting of over 100 vehicles of a Panzer unit. The blocked vehicles were then destroyed by handgrenades, bazooka, tank, and artillery fire and large numbers of enemy personnel were wiped out by a bold and resolute bayonet charge inspired by Sgt. Whittington. When the medical aid man had become a casualty, Sgt. Whittington personally administered first aid to his wounded men. The dynamic leadership, the inspiring example, and the dauntless courage of Sgt. Whittington, above and beyond the call of duty, are in keeping with the highest traditions of the military service.

See also

List of Medal of Honor recipients
List of Medal of Honor recipients for World War II

References
Ordnance Hall of Fame

1921 births
1969 deaths
United States Army personnel of World War II
United States Army Medal of Honor recipients
People from Bogalusa, Louisiana
United States Army officers
Burials at Arlington National Cemetery
World War II recipients of the Medal of Honor
Battle of Normandy recipients of the Medal of Honor
Military personnel from Louisiana